Leonard Townsend Gerow (July 13, 1888 – October 12, 1972) was a general in the United States Army who served with distinction in both World War I and World War II.

A 1911 graduate the Virginia Military Institute (VMI), Gerow served with the United States occupation of Veracruz and on the Signal Corps staff on the Western Front during World War I. After the war he attended the Infantry School, the Command and General Staff School, and the Army War College.

During World War II, he was the Chief of War Plans Division of the War Department General Staff. He would later be reprimanded for his actions in the lead up to the Japanese attack on Pearl Harbor. He commanded the 29th Infantry Division and then the V Corps. As such, Gerow played a major part in the planning of Operation Overlord, the invasion of continental Europe. He was the first corps commander ashore on D-Day, June 6, 1944, and continued in command through the Battle of Normandy, which saw his divisions sustain heavy casualties. He became the first American major general to enter Paris after its liberation. In January 1945, he assumed command of the Fifteenth Army.

Early life
Leonard Townsend Gerow was born in Petersburg, Virginia, on July 13, 1888, the son of  Leonard Rogers Gerow, a railroad conductor, and Annie Eloise Saunders. The name Gerow was derived from the French name "Giraud". He had three brothers and a sister.

Gerow attended high school in Petersburg and then attended the Virginia Military Institute (VMI). from which he graduated with a Bachelor of Science degree in 1911. He was three times elected class president, and was the recipient of the "Honor Appointment" which, at the time, permitted one man in each VMI graduating class to become a Regular Army second lieutenant without further examination. He was commissioned as a second lieutenant in the Infantry Branch of the United States Army on 29 September 1911. His brother Lee S. Gerow graduated from the VMI in 1913, and eventually rose to the rank of brigadier general.

Early military career
Prior to World War I, Gerow served in a series of assignments as a company grade officer in the Infantry. In 1915 he won commendation for his work in the 1915 Galveston Hurricane. He also participated in the United States occupation of Veracruz. He was promoted to first lieutenant on 1 July 1916 and later to captain on 15 May 1917, shortly after the American entry into World War I on 6 April 1917.

From 16 January 1918 to 30 June 1920 Gerow served on the Signal Corps staff on the Western Front. He participated in the Second Battle of the Marne, Battle of Saint-Mihiel and the Meuse–Argonne offensive. He was promoted to the temporary rank of lieutenant colonel, in charge of purchasing all the radio equipment for the American Expeditionary Forces (AEF) in Belgium and France. For his services during the war he was awarded the Army Distinguished Service Medal and the French Legion of Honour. The citation for his Army DSM reads:

After returning to the United States, he was promoted to the permanent rank of major on 1 July 1920. He attended the advanced course at the Infantry School at Fort Benning, Georgia, in the fall of 1924. He graduated first in the class in 1925 from the Advanced Course at the Infantry School. Omar Bradley graduated second. Gerow attended the Command and General Staff School, where Dwight D. Eisenhower was his study partner.  In 1931 he completed the Field Officer's Course in Chemical Warfare and Tanks, and took a course at Army War College. His first wife, Kathryn Getchell, died on June 17, 1933. He then married to Mary Louise Kennedy, who died on October 29, 1970. He had no children.

Gerow served in China in 1932 in the Shanghai sector during the January 28 incident. On 1 August 1935 he was promoted to the permanent rank of lieutenant colonel. On 1 September 1940, prior to the American entry into World War II, he became a colonel in the permanent grade and a month later, on 1 October 1940, he became a temporary brigadier general.

World War II
At the time of the attack on Pearl Harbor and the entry of the United States into World War II in December 1941, Gerow was Chief of War Plans Division of the war Department General Staff. He was promoted to temporary  major general on 14 February 1942. Let's see what you can do."

In October 1942, Gerow became Commanding General (CG) of the 29th Infantry Division, an Army National Guard formation recruiting largely from Virginia, although the Chief of Staff of the United States Army, General George C. Marshall, had doubts about Gerow's ability. He received the Legion of Merit on 27 September 1943 for his work as a division commander and as Chief of Staff of the War Plans Division.

Lieutenant General Jacob L. Devers, the commander of the European Theater of Operations, United States Army (ETOUSA) selected Gerow to replace Major General  Russell P. Hartle as commander of V Corps on 17 July 1943. At the time this was the largest unit of troops in ETOUSA. As such, Gerow played a major part in the planning of Operation Overlord, the invasion of continental Europe. When Eisenhower replaced Devers as theater commander, he and Bradley removed three other corps commanders, Willis D. Crittenberger, Emil F. Reinhardt and Roscoe B. Woodruff, and replaced them with three generals with combat experience in the war as division commanders, but they retained Gerow. He was awarded an oak leaf cluster to his Distinguished Service Medal on August 8, 1944, for his contributions to the planning phase of Operation Overlord.

Gerow was the first corps commander ashore on D-Day, June 6, 1944, and continued in command through the Battle of Normandy, which saw his divisions sustain heavy casualties. V Corps was initially composed of two infantry divisions: the veteran 1st under Clarence R. Huebner and the green 29th, his old division, now commanded by Charles H. Gerhardt. He was the first American officer of the rank of major general to enter Paris after its liberation by the French 2nd Armored Division and the U.S. 4th Infantry Division. For his part in this campaign he was awarded the Silver Star. His citation read: 

Gerow commanded V Corps from 17 July 1943 to 17 September 1944 and again from 5 October 1944 to 14 January 1945. In the gap between the two periods of command he returned to the United States to appear before the Army Board's Pearl Harbor Investigation. The resulting Clausen Report found fault with Gerow's performance, citing his failure to keep Lieutenant General Walter Short fully informed and to give him clear guidance.

Eisenhower and Bradley held Gerow in high regard and ranked him as one of the top American field commanders of World War II. In a February 1945 memo General Eisenhower listed the principal American commanders in order of merit based on the value of their service during the war. Gerow was listed 8 of 32. In a letter to Marshall on April 26, 1945, regarding commanders who might go on to serve in the Pacific, Eisenhower commended Bradley most highly and then said: "In Europe there are other men who have been thoroughly tested as high combat commanders, including Simpson, Patch, Patton, Gerow, Collins, Truscott and others. Any one of these can successfully lead an army in combat in the toughest kind of conditions."

Gerow was given command of the newly formed Fifteenth Army on 15 January 1945. He was promoted to lieutenant general on 6 February 1945, with the promotion being effective 1 January 1945.

Post–World War II career

After the war Gerow was appointed Commandant of the Command and General Staff College. He was placed in charge of a board which studied and proposed how army colleges ought to be organized, post war. In February 1946 the Gerow Board recommended five separate colleges. In January 1948, he was appointed Commanding General of the Second Army. This was his last post; he retired from the army, after almost 40 years service, on July 31, 1950. He was promoted to the rank of full general on July 19, 1954 by a special Act of Congress (Public Law 83-508).

Gerow died at Kenner Army Hospital at Fort Lee, Virginia, on October 12, 1972, and was buried in Arlington National Cemetery. His papers are in the Virginia Military Institute archives.

Notes

References

External links
Arlington National Cemetery
Generals of World War II
United States Army Officers 1939–1945

|-

|-

|-

|-

1888 births
1972 deaths
People from Petersburg, Virginia
Commandants of the United States Army Command and General Staff College
United States Army personnel of World War I
Burials at Arlington National Cemetery
Virginia Military Institute alumni
Recipients of the Distinguished Service Medal (US Army)
Recipients of the Legion of Merit
Recipients of the Silver Star
Recipients of the Croix de guerre (Belgium)
Recipients of the Croix de Guerre (France)
Grand Officers of the Order of Leopold II
United States Army Infantry Branch personnel
Recipients of the Order of Suvorov, 2nd class
Commandeurs of the Légion d'honneur
Recipients of the Air Medal
Honorary Companions of the Order of the Bath
Recipients of the Order of Military Merit (Brazil)
Military personnel from Virginia
United States Army generals of World War II
United States Army generals
Military personnel of the Second Sino-Japanese War